Vicente Álvarez may refer to:

 Vicente Álvarez Travieso (1705–1779), Spanish judge and politician
 Vicente Álvarez (general) (1862–1942), Filipino revolutionary general
 Vicente Álvarez Areces (1943–2013), Spanish politician
 Vicente Álvarez (footballer) (born 1960), Spanish footballer